Millie Jackson is the self-titled debut album by singer-songwriter, Millie Jackson. This album is different from all her other album to follow in that this album features some Motown style songs. It includes the R&B hits "A Child of God (It's Hard to Believe)", "My Man, A Sweet Man" and "Ask Me What You Want." The album was arranged by Tony Camillo and Bert de Coteaux.

In 2006, Ace Records in the UK digitally remastered this album (along with four other best-selling Millie Jackson albums) and released it on CD with bonus tracks and extensive liner notes.

Track listings
All tracks composed by Raeford Gerald, except where indicated
"If This Is Love"
"I Ain't Giving Up" (Raeford Gerald, Joe Simon, Dock Price Jr.)
"I Miss You Baby"
"A Child of God (It's Hard to Believe)" (Millie Jackson, Don French)
"Ask Me What You Want" (Millie Jackson, Billy Nichols)
"My Man, a Sweet Man"
"You're The Joy of My Life" (Raeford Gerald, Reginald Spruill)
"I Gotta Get Away (From My Own Self)" (Raeford Gerald, Dock Price Jr.)
"I Just Can't Stand It" (Millie Jackson, Billy Nichols)
"Strange Things"

2006 bonus tracks
11. "A Little Bit of Something" (Billy Nichols)
12. "My Heart Took a Licking (But It Kept on Ticking)" (Trudy Berry, Victor Davis)
13. "Untrue Men" (Trudy Berry, Pat McQueen, Eugene Hamilton, Rob Reeco)
14. "I Don't Wanna Talk About It"
15. "Ask Me What You Want" (Unedited Master)
16. "You're the Joy of My Life" (Alternate Take)
17. "My Man, a Sweet Man" (Unedited Master)
18. "I Just Can't Stand It" (Unedited Master)
19. "I Miss You Baby" (Alternate Mix with Additional Strings)
20. "Strange Things" (Alternate Mix with Additional Strings)
21. "Hypocrisy" (Alternate Version)

Charts

Singles

References

External links
 Millie Jackson-Millie Jackson at Discogs

1972 debut albums
Millie Jackson albums
Spring Records albums